Events from the year 1668 in France.

Incumbents 
Monarch: Louis XIV

Events
 May 2 – The first Treaty of Aix-la-Chapelle ends the War of Devolution.
 September 9 – Molière's comedy The Miser (L'Avare) is first performed, in Paris.

Births
 May 8 – Alain-René Lesage, novelist and playwright (d. 1747)
 November 10
 Louis, Prince of Condé, Bourbon royal duke (d. 1710) 
 François Couperin, composer (d. 1733)
 November 27 – Henri François d'Aguesseau, Chancellor of France (d. 1751)

Deaths
 May 8 – Catherine of St. Augustine, canoness and nurse of New France (b. 1632)
 December 11 – Marquise-Thérèse de Gorla, actress (b. 1633)

See also

References

1660s in France